Gomal Medical College (Urdu, Saraiki:), or GMC, is a public medical institute located in Dera Ismail Khan, Pakistan. It is one of the newer generation of medical colleges in the public sector that were set up by the government in the 1990s to meet the ever-growing demand for health service providers in the Pakistan.It started functioning in 1998 and now has grown into an established seat of medical learning in the region. It was initially affiliated with the University of Peshawar, which has been the premium public sector university in the province of Khyber-Pakhtunkhwa since 1952. Now it is affiliated with the Khyber Medical University.

History
Maulana Fazl-ur-Rehman  inaugurated the college in 1998. It was established to provide medical education and healthcare facilities for Dera Ismail Khan Division.

Academic schedule 
All aspiring medical students have to undertake ETEA medical test for public sector medical colleges of the province consisting of 200 MCQs held in August. Successful candidates usually start their classes by November each year. The college follows the same academic guidelines which have been laid down by the PMDC (Pakistan Medical and Dental Council).

Departments

Basic Medical Sciences

Anatomy 
Physiology
Biochemistry 
Pharmacology & Therapeutics
Pathology and microbiology
Community medicine
Forensic medicine

Clinical Sciences 
Medicine (including neurology, pulmonology, cardiology, gastroenterology and nephrology)
Surgery 
Otorhinolaryngology
Ophthalmology
Orthopaedic surgery
Obstetrics and Gynaecology
Paediatrics
Psychiatry
Radiology
Dermatology
Anaesthesiology
Urology

Curriculum

First Professional Year:
Anatomy, Embryology and Histology
Human Physiology
Medical Biochemistry
Second Professional Year:
Anatomy, Embryology, Neuroanatomy and Histology
Human Physiology
Islamiat/and Pakistan studies
Medical Biochemistry

Third Professional Year:
Forensic Medicine and Toxicology
General Pathology and Microbiology
Pharmacology and Therapeutics

Fourth Professional Year:
Community Medicine
Ophthalmology
Otorhinolaryngology (ENT)
Special Pathology

Fifth Professional Year:
Gynecology and Obstetrics
Medicine, Psychiatry and Dermatology
Pediatrics
Surgery, Orthopedics and Anesthesia

Societies 
Gomal Medical College having societies like;
 Literary Society
 Sports Society
 Hayyan Magazine
 Student Welfare Society
 Heal With Smile

Affiliated teaching hospitals 
 Mufti Mehmood Medical Complex
 District Headquarters Teaching Hospital

Recognitions 
The college is fully recognised by the Pakistan Medical and Dental Council (PMDC) and is listed in the International Medical Education Directory (IMED) maintained by FAIMER.

External links 
Khyber Medical University 
Gomal Medical College
FAIMER list of recognised medical colleges
Pakistan Medical and Dental Council

Public universities and colleges in Khyber Pakhtunkhwa
Khyber Medical University
Medical colleges in Khyber Pakhtunkhwa
1998 establishments in Pakistan
Educational institutions established in 1998